Luís Miguel Pássaro Cavaco (born 1 March 1972) is a Portuguese retired professional footballer who played as a right winger.

Football career
Born in Almada, Setúbal District, Cavaco spent his first five years as a senior in the lower leagues of his country. He belonged to C.F. Estrela da Amadora for a brief period of time, never appearing officially for the club and representing three other teams in this timeframe.

In the 1995–96 season, Cavaco excelled with G.D. Estoril Praia in the second division alongside Pauleta, with the pair combining for 30 league goals even though the Lisbon side could only rank in 12th position. Subsequently, he moved abroad with Stockport County in England, appearing sparingly as the team promoted from League One.

Released by the Hatters in summer 1998, with competitive totals of 40 matches and seven goals, Cavaco returned to his country and joined Boavista F.C. in the Primeira Liga. In his only season with the Porto club his output consisted of 31 minutes in a 1–2 home loss against C.S. Marítimo – the league's last matchday – and he moved to fellow league team S.C. Farense for three further campaigns of relative playing time, suffering relegation in his last.

Cavaco retired from football in 2006 at the age of 34, after four years in division two with F.C. Felgueiras (one season) and Portimonense SC (three). After a short spell as assistant manager at C.D. Olivais e Moscavide, he went on to work as a security at a shopping mall.

References

External links

1972 births
Living people
Sportspeople from Almada
Portuguese footballers
Association football wingers
Primeira Liga players
Liga Portugal 2 players
Segunda Divisão players
C.F. Estrela da Amadora players
Casa Pia A.C. players
G.D. Estoril Praia players
Boavista F.C. players
S.C. Farense players
F.C. Felgueiras players
Portimonense S.C. players
English Football League players
Stockport County F.C. players
Portuguese expatriate footballers
Expatriate footballers in England
Portuguese expatriate sportspeople in England